Muhlenbergia uniflora is a small species of grass, commonly called one-flowered muhly.  It is native to north eastern USA and adjoining area of Canada.

Description
Muhlenbergia uniflora is a small perennial grass that is non-rhizomatous. Culms (stems) tufted, 2–4 dm tall. The one flowered spikelets are purple, arranged in open, diffuse panicles. The glumes are much shorter than the lemmas, and both are awnless.

References

uniflora
Garden plants of North America
Flora of North America